Scopula eclipes is a moth of the  family Geometridae. It is found in Argentina.

References

Moths described in 1910
eclipes
Moths of South America